Carham railway station was located in the historic county of Roxburghshire, Scotland, from 1849 to 1964 on the Kelso Branch. It served the village of Carham in Northumberland, England.

History 
The station opened on 27 July 1849 by the York, Newcastle and Berwick Railway. It was situated on a minor lane on the B6350. Even though the station was named Carham, it was located in Roxburghshire, being 3 quarters of a mile from the village. To the east was the goods yard and Shidlaw Tile Works, which was served by a siding near the two limekilns to the south. The works closed in 1898. A signal box was built in 1880 but it was replaced by another in 1903 to the southwest of the level crossing. The final passenger train called at the station on 2 July 1955 and passenger trains officially ceased two days later. It closed to goods on 18 May 1964.

References

External links 

Disused railway stations in the Scottish Borders
Railway stations opened in 1849
Railway stations closed in 1955
1849 establishments in Scotland
1964 disestablishments in Scotland
Former North Eastern Railway (UK) stations

Railway stations in Great Britain opened in 1849